Mustafa Town (Punjabi) is a neighbourhood located within union council 109 (Sikander) in Samanabad Tehsil of Lahore, Punjab, Pakistan. It is located on Wahdat Road and Old Multan Road Chungi. The neighbourhood was developed by the Lahore Development Authority. It borders Education Town, Ghani Colony and Mansoorah to the west.

Blocks
Mamdot Block
Hadayat Ullah Block
Qayyum Block
Abbas Block
Shahbaz Block
Ahmed Yar Block

External links
 Housing schemes owe LESCO millions, Daily Times, October 18, 2004 - power supply problems
 Mustafa Town Map - Lahore Real Estate

Samanabad Zone